Old South Church is a historic church at 9802 Chillicothe Road in Kirtland, Ohio.

It was built in 1859 with Romanesque and Carpenter Gothic elements and added to the National Register of Historic Places in 1973.

It was built on the site of the first church in Kirtland, which was a log cabin built by the first congregation, which formed in 1819.
It has a gable roof and a three-story tower topped by an octagonal spire.

The congregation is currently affiliated with the United Church of Christ.

References

External links
 Official website

Churches on the National Register of Historic Places in Ohio
Romanesque Revival church buildings in Ohio
United Church of Christ churches in Ohio
Churches completed in 1859
Churches in Lake County, Ohio
National Register of Historic Places in Lake County, Ohio
Kirtland, Ohio